There are about 175 known moth species of Guinea. The moths (mostly nocturnal) and butterflies (mostly diurnal) together make up the taxonomic order Lepidoptera.

This is a list of moth species which have been recorded in Guinea.

Arctiidae
Afrasura discreta Durante, 2009
Afrasura hieroglyphica (Bethune-Baker, 1911)
Afrasura pallescens Durante, 2009
Afrowatsonius marginalis (Walker, 1855)
Alpenus maculosa (Stoll, 1781)
Alytarchia amanda (Boisduval, 1847)
Amata alicia (Butler, 1876)
Amata kuhlweini (Lefèbvre, 1832)
Amerila vidua (Cramer, 1780)
Amphicallia thelwalli (Druce, 1882)
Anapisa holobrunnea Tams, 1932
Anapisa monotonia Kiriakoff, 1963
Argina amanda (Boisduval, 1847)
Balacra caeruleifascia Walker, 1856
Balacra flavimacula Walker, 1856
Euchromia folletii Guérin-Méniville, 1832
Metarctia maria Kiriakoff, 1957
Ovenna guineacola (Strand, 1912)
Ovenna vicaria (Walker, 1854)
Phaegorista agaristiodes (Boisduval, 1836)
Pseudothyretes rubicundula (Strand, 1912)
Radiarctia lutescens (Walker, 1854)

Autostichidae
Aprominta australis Gozmány, 1966

Bombycidae
Vingerhoedtia ruficollis (Strand, 1910)

Brahmaeidae
Dactyloceras swanzii (Butler, 1871)

Drepanidae
Epicampoptera ivoirensis Watson, 1965
Epicampoptera marantica (Tams, 1930)
Epicampoptera strandi Bryk, 1913
Spidia fenestrata Butler, 1878

Elachistidae
Exaeretia hermophila (Meyrick, 1922)

Eupterotidae
Acrojana sciron Druce, 1887
Hibrildes norax Druce, 1887
Jana eurymas Herrich-Schäffer, 1854

Gelechiidae
Brachmia circumfusa Meyrick, 1922

Geometridae
Archichlora viridimacula (Warren, 1898)
Biston abruptaria (Walker, 1869)
Biston antecreta (Prout, 1938)
Biston johannaria (Oberthür, 1913)
Biston subocularia (Mabille, 1893)
Cabera limbata (Herbulot, 1954)
Chiasmia umbrata (Warren, 1897)
Chrysocraspeda rosina Warren, 1898
Conolophia persimilis (Warren, 1905)
Geodena melusine (Strand, 1909)
Hypocoela turpisaria (Swinhoe, 1904)
Idaea inquisita (Prout, 1932)
Melinoessa aemonia (Swinhoe, 1904)
Menophra dnophera (Prout, 1915)
Scopula latitans Prout, 1920
Zamarada acrochra Prout, 1928
Zamarada adumbrata D. S. Fletcher, 1974
Zamarada amymone Prout, 1934
Zamarada bastelbergeri Gaede, 1915
Zamarada bicuspida D. S. Fletcher, 1974
Zamarada corroborata Herbulot, 1954
Zamarada cucharita D. S. Fletcher, 1974
Zamarada cydippe Herbulot, 1954
Zamarada dentigera Warren, 1909
Zamarada dilucida Warren, 1909
Zamarada dolorosa D. S. Fletcher, 1974
Zamarada dyscapna D. S. Fletcher, 1974
Zamarada emaciata D. S. Fletcher, 1974
Zamarada eucharis (Drury, 1782)
Zamarada euphrosyne Oberthür, 1912
Zamarada excavata Bethune-Baker, 1913
Zamarada ilaria Swinhoe, 1904
Zamarada indicata D. S. Fletcher, 1974
Zamarada ixiaria Swinhoe, 1904
Zamarada labifera Prout, 1915
Zamarada melanopyga Herbulot, 1954
Zamarada melpomene Oberthür, 1912
Zamarada mimesis D. S. Fletcher, 1974
Zamarada nasuta Warren, 1897
Zamarada paxilla D. S. Fletcher, 1974
Zamarada perlepidata (Walker, 1863)
Zamarada plana Basterberger, 1909
Zamarada protrusa Warren, 1897
Zamarada reflexaria (Walker, 1863)
Zamarada regularis D. S. Fletcher, 1974
Zamarada vigilans Prout, 1915
Zamarada vulpina Warren, 1897

Himantopteridae
Doratopteryx dissemurus Kiriakoff, 1963

Lasiocampidae
Euphorea ondulosa (Conte, 1909)
Gonometa nysa Druce, 1887
Mimopacha gerstaeckerii (Dewitz, 1881)
Odontocheilopteryx haribda Gurkovich & Zolotuhin, 2009
Pallastica lateritia (Hering, 1928)
Sophyrita argibasis (Mabille, 1893)

Limacodidae
Parasa divisa West, 1940

Lymantriidae
Bracharoa mixta (Snellen, 1872)
Crorema ochracea (Snellen, 1872)
Euproctis molunduana Aurivillius, 1925
Laelia subrosea (Walker, 1855)
Opoboa chrysoparala Collenette, 1932
Otroeda hesperia (Cramer, 1779)

Metarbelidae
Metarbela onusta Karsch, 1896
Moyencharia sommerlattei Lehmann, 2013

Noctuidae
Abrostola confusa Dufay, 1958
Achaea lienardi Boisduval, 1833
Acontia citrelinea Bethune-Baker, 1911
Acontia imitatrix Wallengren, 1856
Acontia insocia (Walker, 1857)
Aegocera rectilinea Boisduval, 1836
Aegocera tigrina (Druce, 1882)
Andrhippuris caudaequina Karsch, 1895
Asota speciosa (Drury, 1773)
Chaetostephana inclusa (Karsch, 1895)
Cyligramma latona (Cramer, 1775)
Cyligramma limacina (Guérin-Méneville, 1832)
Dysgonia pudica (Möschler, 1887)
Dysgonia torrida (Guenée, 1852)
Eudocima divitiosa (Walker, 1869)
Eudocima materna (Linnaeus, 1767)
Feliniopsis africana (Schaus & Clements, 1893)
Feliniopsis nigribarbata (Hampson, 1908)
Fodina albicincta (Walker, 1869)
Godasa sidae (Fabricius, 1793)
Heliophisma klugii (Boisduval, 1833)
Heraclia geryon (Fabricius, 1781)
Heraclia poggei (Dewitz, 1879)
Hespagarista caudata (Dewitz, 1879)
Hypena obacerralis Walker, [1859]
Marcipa aequatorialis Pelletier, 1975
Masalia flavistrigata (Hampson, 1903)
Masalia nubila (Hampson, 1903)
Masalia rubristria (Hampson, 1903)
Miniodes discolor Guenée, 1852
Ophiusa conspicienda Walker, 1858
Parachalciope binaria Holland, 1894
Parachalciope euclidicola Walker, 1858
Phaegorista agaristoides Boisduval, 1836
Spodoptera exempta (Walker, 1857)
Thiacidas meii Hacker & Zilli, 2007
Thiacidas mukim (Berio, 1977)
Thiacidas submutata Hacker & Zilli, 2007
Timora perrosea de Joannis, 1910

Nolidae
Arcyophora zanderi Felder & Rogenhofer, 1874
Leucophanera argyrozona de Joannis, 1911

Notodontidae
Andocidia tabernaria Kiriakoff, 1958
Chlorochadisra viridipulverea (Gaede, 1928)
Desmeocraera roseoviridis Kiriakoff, 1958
Desmeocraera varia (Walker, 1855)
Stauropussa chloe (Holland, 1893)
Ulinella royi Kiriakoff, 1963

Psychidae
Eumeta cervina Druce, 1887
Narycia epibyrsa Meyrick, 1922

Pterophoridae
Antarches aguessei (Bigot, 1964)
Buckleria girardi Gibeaux, 1992
Pterophorus lamottei Gibeaux, 1992
Pterophorus legrandi Gibeaux, 1992
Sphenarches anisodactylus (Walker, 1864)

Pyralidae
Acracona lamottei (Marion, 1954)

Saturniidae
Aurivillius triramis (Rothschild, 1907)
Campimoptilum kuntzei (Dewitz, 1881)
Decachorda aspersa (Felder, 1874)
Epiphora albidus (Druce, 1886)
Epiphora boolana Strand, 1909
Epiphora getula (Maassen & Weymer, 1885)
Epiphora magdalena Grünberg, 1909
Epiphora ploetzi (Weymer, 1880)
Epiphora vacuna (Westwood, 1849)
Eudaemonia trogophylla Hampson, 1919
Gonimbrasia hecate Rougeot, 1955
Lobobunaea acetes (Westwood, 1849)
Nudaurelia alopia Westwood, 1849
Nudaurelia dione (Fabricius, 1793)
Nudaurelia emini (Butler, 1888)
Orthogonioptilum nimbaense Rougeot, 1962
Orthogonioptilum prox Karsch, 1892
Rohaniella pygmaea (Maassen & Weymer, 1885)

Sphingidae
Acherontia atropos (Linnaeus, 1758)
Euchloron megaera (Linnaeus, 1758)
Neopolyptychus ancylus (Rothschild & Jordan, 1916)
Neopolyptychus consimilis (Rothschild & Jordan, 1903)
Nephele comma Hopffer, 1857
Phylloxiphia bicolor (Rothschild, 1894)
Phylloxiphia goodii (Holland, 1889)
Phylloxiphia illustris (Rothschild & Jordan, 1906)
Phylloxiphia oberthueri (Rothschild & Jordan, 1903)
Polyptychus carteri (Butler, 1882)
Pseudenyo benitensis Holland, 1889
Pseudoclanis occidentalis Rothschild & Jordan, 1903
Sphingonaepiopsis nana (Walker, 1856)
Temnora nephele Clark, 1922
Theretra perkeo Rothschild & Jordan, 1903

Thyrididae
Arniocera collenettei Talbot, 1929

Tineidae
Cimitra fetialis (Meyrick, 1917)
Criticonoma gypsocoma (Meyrick, 1931)
Histiovalva fortunata Gozmány, 1965
Hyperbola pastoralis (Meyrick, 1931)
Monopis addenda Gozmány, 1965
Syncalipsis optania (Meyrick, 1908)

Tortricidae
Cydia improbana (Snellen, 1872)
Sanguinograptis albardana (Snellen, 1872)

See also 
 List of butterflies of Guinea

General:
 Wildlife of Guinea

References

External links 
 

Guinea
Moths
Guinea
Guinea